Gustavo Kuerten won the singles tennis title at the 1999 Monte Carlo Open when Marcelo Ríos retired from the final with the scoreline at 6–4, 2–1.

Carlos Moyá was the defending champion, but lost in the quarterfinals to Jérôme Golmard.

Seeds
The top eight seeds received a bye to the second round.

Draw

Finals

Top half

Section 1

Section 2

Bottom half

Section 3

Section 4

References

External links
 ATP main draw

Singles